Bennie Ellender Jr. (March 2, 1925 – December 22, 2011) was an American football player and coach. He served as the head football coach at Arkansas State University from 1963 to 1970 and at Tulane University from 1971 to 1975, compiling a career college football record of 79–49–4.

Ellender led the Arkansas State program to three consecutive Pecan Bowl games, which was one of the regional bowl games set up for the NCAA College Division to choose a champion.  His 1970 team finished 11–0 and was ranked #1 in the final polls, earning his team the College Division championship.  Ellender was selected AFCA College Division Coach of the Year following the season.  After the 1970 season, Ellender left ASU to become head football coach at his alma mater, Tulane.

Head coaching record

References

1925 births
2011 deaths
American football quarterbacks
American football safeties
Arkansas State Red Wolves football coaches
Tulane Green Wave football coaches
Tulane Green Wave football players
United States Navy personnel of World War II
People from Sulphur, Louisiana
Players of American football from Louisiana
Neurological disease deaths in Louisiana
Deaths from Alzheimer's disease